Princess Shruti Rajya Lakshmi Devi Shah of Nepal (15 October 1976 – 1 June 2001) was the daughter of King Birendra and Queen Aishwarya, and sister of King Dipendra and Prince Nirajan.

Education 

Princess Shruti studied at Kanti Ishwari Sishu Vidhyalaya in Tripureswar, Nepal, St. Mary's School in Kathmandu, Nepal, and later at Mayo College Girls School in Ajmer, India. She completed her bachelor's degree at Padma Kanya Campus in Nepal.

She was a meritorious painter.

Marriage and family 
She was married to Kumar Gorakh Shumsher Jang Bahadur Rana, a member of an aristocratic Rana family of Nepal, descendants of Maharaja Chandra Shumsher Jang Bahadur Rana. He is Head Global Banking and Commercial Banking for Standard Chartered Bank Nepal Limited.

They married on 7 May 1997 in Kathmandu. They had two daughters:

 Girwani Rajya Lakshmi Devi Rana (born on 22 June 1998 in Kathmandu). 
 Surangana Rajya Lakshmi Devi Rana (born on 21 October 2000 in Thapathali, Kathmandu).

On 5 December 2008 in Kathmandu, Kumar Gorakh Shumsher Jang Bahadur Rana, married Deepti Chand, a humanities student at Kathmandu's Padma Kanya Multiple Campus, who is also the niece of a former royalist prime minister Lokendra Bahadur Chand.

Name Shruti means "that which is heard".

Death 

Princess Shruti, her mother, father, and brother Nirajan, and six other Royal relatives were killed in the Nepalese royal massacre on 1 June 2001.

Honours 
National Honours
 Member First Class of the Order of Gorkha Dakshina Bahu (29/12/1995).
 Commemorative Silver Jubilee Medal of King Birendra (31/01/1997).
 Bisista Sewa Padak [Special Service Medal] (1999).
Foreign Honours
  : Grand Officer of the Order of the Legion of Honour (20/09/1994).
  : Dame Grand Cross Order of Merit of the Federal Republic of Germany (25/11/1996).

Ancestry

References 

1976 births
2001 deaths
2001 murders in Asia
20th-century Nepalese people
21st-century Nepalese people
20th-century Nepalese women
21st-century Nepalese women
Deaths by firearm in Nepal
Female murder victims
Nepalese murder victims
Nepalese princesses
People murdered in Nepal
Murdered royalty
Mayo College Girls School alumni
Grand Officiers of the Légion d'honneur
Grand Crosses 1st class of the Order of Merit of the Federal Republic of Germany
Members of the Order of Gorkha Dakshina Bahu, First Class
Shah dynasty
Padma Kanya Multiple Campus alumni